Youssef Anis Abi Aad, IdP (12 January 1940 – 6 May 2017) was the archeparch of the Maronite Catholic Archeparchy of Aleppo until November 2013.

Life

Youssef Anis Abi Aad joined the Prado Secular Institute and received on 18 June 1966 his ordination to the priesthood.

On 7 June 1997 he was elected by the Maronite Synod to the Archbishopric of Aleppo. The Maronite Patriarch of Antioch and all the East, Cardinal Nasrallah Boutros Sfeir, gave him on 1 November of the same year the episcopal ordination. His co-consecrators were Bechara Boutros al-Rahi, OMM, Bishop of Byblos and present Maronite Patriarch of Antioch, and Paul Youssef Matar, Archbishop of Beirut.

See also

References

External links

 http://www.catholic-hierarchy.org/bishop/babiaad.html 

1940 births
2017 deaths
Lebanese Maronites
21st-century Maronite Catholic bishops
20th-century Maronite Catholic bishops